DBS Bank Limited, often known as DBS, is a Singaporean multinational banking and financial services corporation headquartered at the Marina Bay Financial Centre in the Marina Bay district of Singapore. The bank was previously known as The Development Bank of Singapore Limited, which "DBS" was derived from, before the present abbreviated name was adopted on 21 July 2003 to reflect its role as a global bank. It is one of the "Big Three" banks in Singapore, along with OCBC Bank and the United Overseas Bank (UOB).

Listed on the Singapore Exchange, the bank was set up by the Government of Singapore on 16 July 1968 to take over the industrial financing activities from the Economic Development Board. Today, its more than 150 branches can be found throughout the country. DBS is the largest bank in Southeast Asia by assets and among the largest banks in Asia, with assets totaling about US$501 billion (S$650 billion) as of 31 December 2019. It also holds market-dominant positions in consumer banking, treasury and markets, asset management, securities brokerage, equity and debt fund-raising in other regions aside from Singapore, including in China, Hong Kong, Taiwan, Indonesia and South Korea.

DBS's largest and controlling shareholder is Temasek Holdings, Singapore's second-largest sovereign wealth fund after GIC. As of 31 March 2018, Temasek owns 29% of DBS shares. The bank's reliable capital position has garnered a "AA−" and "Aa1" credit ratings by Standard & Poor's and Moody's, which are among the highest in the Asia-Pacific region, as well as earning the Global Finance's "Safest Bank in Asia" accolade for six consecutive years, from 2009 to 2015. The Bank was also awarded the Best Digital Bank in the World in 2016 by Euromoney. In July 2019, DBS became the first bank in the world to concurrently hold three of the most prestigious global best bank honours from Euromoney, Global Finance and The Banker. 

DBS has been listed on the Dow Jones Sustainability Asia Pacific Index since 2 October 2018, making it the first bank in Southeast Asia to do so. DBS was one of the first companies in Singapore to be recognised for gender equality efforts along with City Developments Limited in the first Bloomberg L.P. Gender-Equality Index (GEI) that was published in 2018. With operations in 17 markets, the bank has a regional network spanning more than 300 branches and over 1,250 ATMs across 50 cities overseas.

History
Established on 16 July 1968 by the government to take over the industrial financing activities from the Economic Development Board, the bank's main purpose was to provide loans and financial aid to the manufacturing and processing industries and to help establish and upgrade existing industries in Singapore.Back in 1960, the government invited a United Nations (UN) industrial survey mission to assess the economic situation in Singapore and to come up with an industrialization programme for the city. The proposal included setting up a development bank, together with an economic body to attract foreign investments and provide financing and managing the industrial estates. The bank was incorporated in July 1968 and began operations in September of the same year.

Acquisition of POSB Bank

Formerly known as Post Office Savings Bank, it was established on 1 January 1877 at the General Post Office Building in Raffles Place by the Straits Settlements government.

By 1976, POSB had one million depositors, while deposits crossed the S$1 billion mark. The bank was then renamed POSBank in 1990, before being acquired by DBS Bank on 16 November 1998 for S$1.6 billion (first announced on 24 July 1998), giving it a dominant market share with over four million customers. 

POSB Bank still operates one of the highest numbers of bank branches in Singapore, especially in the heartlands, and operates the highest number of ATM outlets throughout the country. The integration of both banks allowed customers of either bank to share the facilities; DBS Bank depositors may use the Cash Deposit Machine installed islandwide in POSBank branches, likewise for POSB Bank depositors.

Senior leadership 

 Chairman: Peter Seah (since May 2010)
 Chief Executive: Piyush Gupta (since November 2009)

List of former chairmen 

 Hon Sui Sen (1968–1970)
 Howe Yoon Chong (1970–1979)
 J. Y. Pillay (1979–1985)
 Howe Yoon Chong (1985–1990); second term
 Ngiam Tong Dow (1990–1998)
 S. Dhanabalan (1999–2005)
 Koh Boon Hwee (2006–2010)

List of former CEOs 
 Patrick Yeoh Khawi Hoh (1993–1995)
 John Olds (1998–2001)
 Philippe Paillart (2001–2002)
 Jackson Tai (2002–2007)
 Richard Stanley (2008–2009)

Shareholders
The ten largest shareholders as of 9 February 2021 are:

* Percentage is calculated based on the total number of issued ordinary shares, excluding treasury shares

Temasek Holdings (Pte) Ltd, a company wholly owned by the Ministry of Finance, is deemed to be interested in all the ordinary shares held by Maju. In addition, Temasek is deemed to be interested in 4,449,781 ordinary shares in which its other subsidiaries and associated companies have or are deemed to have an interest pursuant to Section 4 of the Securities and Futures Act, Chapter 289.

International operations
DBS Bank has branches and offices in Australia, China, Hong Kong, India, Indonesia, Japan, South Korea, Malaysia, Myanmar, the Philippines, Taiwan, Thailand, the United Arab Emirates, the United Kingdom, the United States and Vietnam.

China
Strategically located in the key trade and financial hubs of mainland China, DBS has a network of full service branches in Beijing, Guangzhou, Shanghai, Shenzhen, Suzhou, Tianjin, Dongguan, Nanning and Hangzhou; and representative offices in Fuzhou which provide a comprehensive range of commercial and corporate banking services. In December 2006, DBS Bank received approval from the China Banking Regulatory Commission (CBRC) to prepare for local incorporation in Mainland China. DBS is the only Singapore bank among nine foreign banks to receive this approval. In 2010, it also became the first Singapore bank to issue UnionPay debit cards in mainland China.

Hong Kong

DBS started its operations in Great Hong Kong in 1999 by acquiring Kwong On Bank from Leung's family & Japanese-based Fuji Bank, and renamed it as DBS Kwong On Bank Limited. It acquired Dao Heng Bank (and its subsidiary Overseas Trust Bank) in 2001. The three banks were later merged under the trading name of DBS Bank (Hong Kong) Limited.

India
Headquartered in the commercial capital of Mumbai, DBS operates via a network of 33 bank branches across 22 cities in India such as Bangalore, Chennai, Cuddalore, Kochi, Hyderabad, Kolhapur, Kolkata, Coimbatore, Moradabad, Indore, Mumbai (Andheri, Nariman Point), Nashik, New Delhi, Noida, Gurugram, Pune, Salem, Surat and Vadodara. DBS India had a 37.5% stake in DBS Cholamandalam Finance, a non-bank financial institution, in April 2009, it transferred its shares to the parent company Tube Investments of India Limited, thus terminating its shared holder agreement in Cholamandalam DBS. On 17 November 2020, Reserve Bank of India instructed Lakshmi Vilas Bank (LVB) to be merged with DBS India after LVB having placed under moratorium for 30 days.

Indonesia
DBS has a 99%-owned subsidiary, PT Bank DBS Indonesia, with 39 branches and sub-branches in 11 cities.

On 2 April 2012, DBS announced that it was planning to buy over a majority stake in Bank Danamon from Temasek Holdings. Initial reactions to the proposed purchase in Indonesia were cautious with most commentators saying that the deal was expected to be approved but that government regulators would doubtless wish to look at some of the details, including reciprocity from Singapore policy makers, quite closely before making a final decision.

On 31 July 2013, DBS announced that it had allowed the Bank Danamon bid to lapse, but that they remained committed to Indonesia and will continue to invest and grow the franchise.

Taiwan
DBS first established a presence in Taiwan in 1983. 
In May 2008, DBS integrated Taiwan's Bowa Bank into its operations after acquiring the "good bank assets" in February. There are 40 distribution outlets across the country, half of which are based in Taipei.

In January 2022, DBS has agreed to buy Citi's Taiwan retail business as it becomes the largest foreign bank in Taiwan by assets.

The Islamic Bank of Asia

DBS Bank launched The Islamic Bank of Asia (IB Asia) on 7 May 2007, after receiving official approval from the Monetary Authority of Singapore for a full bank licence. IB Asia's founding shareholders include majority stakeholder DBS and 34 Middle Eastern investors from prominent families and industrial groups from Gulf Cooperation Council (GCC) countries.

On 14 September 2015, DBS Bank announced that it will progressively cease IB Asia as it was not able to achieve economies of scale when operated as a single entity. The process was estimated to take about 2 to 3 years, with DBS Bank developing their Islamic compliant banking products instead.

DBS iB Secure Device and Internet banking
Starting in late 2006, the bank began releasing to its Internet banking customers a Dual Factor Authentication device to assist in thwarting phishing attacks. The DBS iB Secure Device is a hardware device with a key fob form factor that generates a password that is linked to the log-on name. The password changes every sixty seconds and once used is no longer valid. The institution Code for DBS is 7171.

In 2012, DBS introduced a New Generation IB Secure Device as part of the financial industry-wide initiative for an even safer online banking experience. The device has stronger authentication capabilities and provides users with an extra layer of security against potential fraudulent activities and threats.

DBS has a total of 2.4 million Internet banking users in Singapore as of 2013.

Mobile banking
On 15 April 2010, DBS Bank launched mBanking to both DBS and POSB customers. It allows customers to view their banking and credit card accounts, transfer funds and pay bills via their mobile phones.

Customers using mBanking will be protected by DBS Bank's 'money-safe' guarantee. The bank promised reimbursements if there are any unauthorised transactions.

As of 2013, there were 839,000 mBanking users in Singapore.

Awards
 Best SME Banking Brand in Taiwan awarded by Global Brands Magazine.
 Best Customer Service Brand in Taiwan'' awarded by Global Brands Magazine.
 World's Best Bank, by Global Finance (New York).
 Global Bank of the Year, by The Banker (Financial Times).
 Asia's Best Bank For SMEs 2022.

References

1968 establishments in Singapore
 
Banks established in 1968
Banks of Singapore
Companies listed on the Singapore Exchange
Multinational companies headquartered in Singapore
Singaporean brands
Singaporean companies established in 1968
Temasek Holdings